During the 2007–08 German football season, FC Hansa Rostock competed in the Bundesliga.

Season summary
Hansa were relegated after one season back in the Bundesliga. As of 2021, it remains their last top-flight season to date.

Players

First-team squad
Squad at end of season

Left club during season

Transfers

In

FC Hansa Rostock

In:

Out:

References

Notes

F.C. Hansa Rostock
FC Hansa Rostock seasons